Brzózki  (formerly ) is a village in the administrative district of Gmina Nowe Warpno, within Police County, West Pomeranian Voivodeship, in north-western Poland, close to the German border. 

The village has a population of 160.

References

Villages in Police County